Keith Cooke Hirabayashi (born September 17, 1959; also known as Keith H. Cooke) is an American martial artist, actor and an occasional stuntman. He is best known for portraying Reptile from Mortal Kombat (1995) and  Sub-Zero from the sequel, Mortal Kombat: Annihilation (1997).

Life and career
Keith Cook Hirabayashi was born in the United States. His father Richard Hirabayashi was Japanese American and his mother is American.

Cooke has trained in wushu, taekwondo and karate. His awards include being named Competitor of the Year by Black Belt magazine in 1985, and five grand champion titles at the U.S. World and U.S. Open Karate tournaments. He is best known for his appearance as Reptile in the video-game movie of Mortal Kombat. He appeared as the younger Sub-Zero in the sequel, Mortal Kombat: Annihilation.

He played a leading role in the 1995 science fiction/martial arts thriller Heatseeker, a follow-up to the 1988 Cynthia Rothrock and Richard Norton vehicle China O'Brien in which he also appeared. He also appeared in the 1997 Chris Farley comedy Beverly Hills Ninja, which starred fellow Mortal Kombat actor Robin Shou. Their previous roles were referenced directly when the soundtrack from Mortal Kombat  was reused during their fight scene.
Cooke now runs his own martial arts studio.

Filmography

References

External links
 
 

American male film actors
American male actors of Japanese descent
American film actors of Asian descent
American people of Scottish descent
American stunt performers
American wushu practitioners
1959 births
Living people